Kotb may refer to:

Qutb, or Kotb, an astronomical term or a spiritual symbol, or Sufi spiritual leader
Ahmed Kotb (born 1991), an Egyptian volleyball player
Heba Kotb (born 1967), an Egyptian sex therapist and TV presenter
Hoda Kotb (born 1964), American-Egyptian journalist, TV personality and author
 Sherif kotb (1975) American-Egyptian HVAC (REEF HVAC)Business owner .
Madiha Kotb (born 1953), an Egyptian-born Canadian engineer
KOTB-FM, original call sign of KBMG, an American radio station

See also